The following is a list of Belgium women's national rugby union team international matches.

Overall 

Belgium's overall international match record against all nations, updated to 27 January 2023, is as follows:

Full internationals

1980s

2000s

2010s

2020s

Other matches

References

Belgium